Allerton (also known as Allerville) is an unincorporated community located within Clinton Township, in Hunterdon County, New Jersey, United States.

By 1846, Allerton had a store, steam saw mill, Baptist church, chair factory, and a few dwellings.

References

Clinton Township, New Jersey
Unincorporated communities in Hunterdon County, New Jersey
Unincorporated communities in New Jersey